Hannah Gavron (born Ann Fyvel; 1936 – 14 December 1965) was a Mandatory Palestine-born British sociologist.

Life and work 
Ann Fyvel was born in British Mandate of Palestine (now Israel) in 1936, the daughter of Mary (Kirschner), who was from South Africa, and T. R. Fyvel, the left-wing Zionist who eventually became the literary editor of Tribune and a friend of the writer George Orwell. She was registered at birth as Ann, but always used the name in the form of Hannah, both privately and professionally. Aged sixteen, she became a student at the Royal Academy of the Dramatic Arts (RADA).

In 1955 she married Robert Gavron, who would become a Labour peer, barrister and printer, but who had then only just started training in printing, having eschewed a legal career for the time being (the same year he married Hannah, he had been called to the bar after graduating from the University of Oxford). Shortly after marrying, Gavron graduated from RADA, but stayed in education; she went on to Bedford College, University of London, where she remained for eight years, firstly to study sociology as an undergraduate (she received a first-class degree) and then to complete a doctorate, which was awarded in 1964 for a thesis on "The position and opportunities of young mothers: progression or retrogression: a study of the difficulties confronting young mothers in the contemporary family based on a comparative study of working class and middle class families". After completing her doctorate, Gavron took up a lectureship at Hornsey School of Art. On 14 December 1965, she locked herself in the kitchen of her neighbour's house in Jackson's Lane, Highgate, switched on its gas oven and committed suicide.

The year after her death, Gavron's thesis was published as The Captive Wife, which is cited as an early example of the emergent British feminist literature and a noted early sociological study on women and work. It was a qualitative sociological analysis of narrative accounts of working- and middle-class married women's lives, and has been called one of the "classic examples of feminist interpretation of housework". She argued that women tended to leave paid work after childbirth and that motherhood stripped women of independence, bringing their values and aspirations as 'New' women into conflict with the traditional role they were having to play as mothers.  In the view of Helen McCarthy, this study meant that Fyvel (Gavron) was one of a number of researchers in the 1950s and early 1960s (such as Nancy Seear, Viola Klein, Ferdynand Zweig, Judith Hubback and Pearl Jephcott) who "helped to entrench new understandings of married women's employment as a fundamental feature of advanced industrial societies, and one that solved the dilemmas of 'modern' woman across social classes."  In 1990, Ann Oakley wrote that Gavron was an "optimistic pioneer of modern feminism" who "stood as a role model for many of us, trying to make our way in the male-dominated world of social science. She even at times appears in the guise of a cultural metaphor à la Sylvia Plath and many others – a woman torn apart by her position on the edge of time, by those same dilemmas of being female which form the subject matter of her work and writing". In 2015, Gavron's son Jeremy published his memoirs of her, A Woman on The Edge of Time, which was the 15 Minute Drama on BBC Radio 4 in June 2019.

References

Further reading 
 Mirra Komarovsky, book review of The Captive Wife, in American Journal of Sociology, vol. 73, no. 1 (1967), pp. 122–123.
 Mildred Weil, book review of The Captive Wife in Social Forces, vol. 45, no. 3 (1966), pp. 460–461.

1936 births
1965 suicides
British sociologists
British people of Belarusian-Jewish descent
English Jews
Gavron family
History of mental health in the United Kingdom
Suicides in Highgate, Greater London
Suicides by gas
English people of South African-Jewish descent
Spouses of life peers
1965 deaths
British women sociologists